Iain Jamieson (14 October 1928 – 19 October 2012) was a Scottish footballer, manager and businessman. Jamieson briefly played for Aberdeen, then signed for Coventry City after completing a spell of National Service. He made over 180 appearances in 10 years playing for Coventry. He became player/manager of Rugby Town after leaving Coventry.

Towards the end of his playing career, Jamieson became a sales manager with the textiles company Courtaulds. He later progressed to a managing director position in the company's nylon division. Jamieson joined the Coventry City board of directors, working with Joe Mercer and Jimmy Hill, in 1973. After Hill left the club in 1983, Jamieson was appointed chairman. Jamieson himself left the board in 1984 and retired from business in 1989. He died in October 2012, aged 84.

References

1928 births
2012 deaths
Sportspeople from Dumbarton
Footballers from West Dunbartonshire
Association football wing halves
Scottish footballers
Aberdeen F.C. players
Coventry City F.C. players
Rugby Town F.C. (1945) players
Scottish Football League players
English Football League players
Scottish football managers
English football chairmen and investors
Coventry City F.C. directors and chairmen
20th-century English businesspeople